Walleroobie is a locality in the north-east part of the Riverina region of south-west New South Wales, Australia.

My grandfather, Ernest Enoch Barker, built the original soldier settler cottages in Walleroobie from 1920 to 1927. He was paid £100 a room and £100 for the roof according to my mother.

Notes and references

Towns in the Riverina
Towns in New South Wales
Coolamon Shire